Brunei Darussalam International Defence Exhibition and Conference (BRIDEX) is a biennial defence exhibition and conference held in Negara Brunei Darussalam starting from 2007. The event was launched by the Ministry of Defence, Brunei Darussalam.

The next BRIDEX event was scheduled to take place on 3–7 December 2013. Ministry of Defence, Brunei Darussalam has once again appointed Royal Brunei Technical Services as organisers of the event.

Venue
In 2009, the BRIDEX International Conference Centre, Jerudong was purpose built for BRIDEX events on a 26-acre site in the Royal Brunei Polo & Riding Club, just five minutes away from the Empire Hotel & Country Club. Exhibitors and visitors benefit from 10,000 square metres of modern air-conditioned exhibition halls; 5,000 square metres adjoining apron space for static displays; a mobility park and marina for live demonstrations of equipment and systems; chalets, restaurants and hospitality facilities.

History
2007

The first BRIDEX took place on 31 May to 2 June 2007, established and organised by the Ministry of Defence, Brunei Darussalam. The event received the participation of 108 companies from 16 countries and 11,000 members of the public visited the event during the three-day period.

2009

BRIDEX2009 took place from 12 to 15 August 2009. The Ministry of Defence had appointed Royal Brunei Technical Services (RBTS), the solely authorised procurement agency of sensitive and strategic goods for the country, as the organisers of the event, with an increase in exhibitors (163 companies from 25 countries) showcasing their products. There were also rises in the number of visitors from previous event (14,000).

2011

Its third installment, BRIDEX2011 took place from 6 to 9 July 2011.

References

External links
 https://web.archive.org/web/20121020031324/http://www.bridex2009.com/
 https://web.archive.org/web/20120925081417/http://www.bridex2011.com/
 https://web.archive.org/web/20130119082335/http://bridex2013.com/
 http://www.bt.com.bn/breaking/2009/08/12/royalties_launch_bridex_2009
 http://www.bt.com.bn/home_news/2007/12/06/bridex_2009_to_feature_more_exhibitors
 http://www.bt.com.bn/home_news/2009/08/16/bridex_2011_will_be_bigger_better

Arms fairs